Avian Diseases is a quarterly peer-reviewed scientific journal publishing research on diseases of birds. It was established in 1957 and is published by the American Association of Avian Pathologists. The editor-in-chief is  Y. M. Saif (Ohio Agricultural Research and Development Center/Ohio State University). According to the Journal Citation Reports, the journal has a 2012 impact factor of 1.734.

References

External links 
 

Quarterly journals
Veterinary medicine journals
Publications established in 1957
English-language journals
Academic journals published by learned and professional societies